Rolugunta is a village in Anakapalli district in the state of Andhra Pradesh in India.

References 

Villages in Anakapalli district